The cartography of the United States is the history of surveying and creation of maps of the United States. Maps of the New World had been produced since the 19th century.  The history of cartography of the United States begins in the 18th century, after the declared independence of the original Thirteen Colonies on July 4, 1776, during the American Revolutionary War (1776–1783). Later, Samuel Augustus Mitchell published a map of the United States in 1850. The National Program for Topographic Mapping was initiated in 2001 by the United States Geological Survey (USGS).

See also
 Geography of the United States
 Territorial evolution of the United States
 United States National Grid
 United States territorial acquisitions
Cartography of New York City

References

Further reading
 S. Max Edelson, The New Map of Empire: How Britain Imagined America Before Independence. Cambridge, Massachusetts: Harvard University Press, 2017
 Susan Schulten, Mapping the Nation: History and Cartography in Nineteenth-Century America. Chicago, Illinois: University of Chicago Press, 2011

External links
 
 125 Years of Topographic Mapping

Maps of the United States